The Revoltella Museum is a modern art gallery founded in Trieste in 1872 by Baron Pasquale Revoltella. The baron, after he left his house to the city (located in Piazza Venezia) and all the works, furniture and books it contained.

Museum
The main building, designed by Friedrich Hitzig, was built in 1858. In order to expand the original collection in 1907 the city acquired the Brunner palace located nearby. However, this building was only put to full use in 1963, following a reconstruction by Carlo Scarpa. The museum today is composed of three buildings with a total exhibition area of 4,000 square meters and the main entrance from Via Diaz.

Exhibits 
In addition to the works bequeathed by baron Revoltella, the city also acquired additional artworks over the years.
On permanent display today are about 350 paintings and sculptures. The Brunner palace host works of Italian authors of the second half of the 19th century (third  floor), the works acquired in the early decades of the 20th century (fourth floor), the works of artists from the Friuli-Venezia Giulia region (fifth floor) and national (sixth floor) in the second half of the 20th century.

Notable Italian and European artists whose works are exhibited in the gallery include:

Museum directors
 Augusto Tominz  (1872–1883)
 Alfredo Tominz (1883–1926)
 Piero Sticotti (1927–1929)
 Edgardo Sambo (1929–1956)
 Giulio Montenero  (1960–1989)
 Maria Masau Dan (1992)

Gallery

References 
 

Buildings and structures in Trieste
Art museums and galleries in Friuli-Venezia Giulia
Art museums established in 1872
1872 establishments in Italy
1872 establishments in Austria-Hungary